Showtime is an American premium television network owned by Paramount Media Networks, and is the flagship property of the namesake parent company, Showtime Networks, a part of Paramount Media Networks. Showtime's programming primarily includes theatrically released motion pictures and original television series, along with boxing and mixed martial arts matches, occasional stand-up comedy specials, and made-for-TV movies.

Headquartered at Paramount Plaza on the northern end of New York City's Broadway district, Showtime operates eight 24-hour, linear multiplex channels; a traditional subscription video on demand service; and two proprietary streaming platforms, the TV Everywhere offering Showtime Anytime (which is included as part of a subscription to the linear Showtime television service) and a namesake over-the-top service sold directly to streaming-only consumers. In addition, the Showtime brand has been licensed for use by a number of channels and platforms worldwide, including Showtime Arabia (since merged into OSN) in the Middle East and North Africa, and the now-defunct Showtime Movie Channels in Australia.

Showtime is also sold independently of traditional and over-the-top multichannel video programming distributors a la carte through Apple TV Channels and Amazon Channels, which feature VOD library content and live feeds of Showtime's linear television services (consisting of the primary channel's East and West Coast feeds and, for Amazon Video customers, the East Coast feeds of its seven multiplex channels). , Showtime's programming was available to approximately 28.567 million U.S. households that subscribed to a multichannel television provider (28.318 million of which receive Showtime's primary channel at minimum). 

On January 30, 2023, Paramount announced plans to fully integrate the Showtime linear service with the premium tier of the Paramount+ streaming service, beginning on a future date yet to be announced; the combined service will be branded as Paramount+ with Showtime, replacing a bundle of the same name that launched in mid-2022.

History

Early years (1976–1982) 
Showtime was launched on July 1, 1976, on Times-Mirror Cable systems in Escondido, Long Beach and Palos Verdes, California through the conversion of 10,000 subscribers of the previous Channel One franchise. The following week on July 8, Showtime launched on Viacom Cablevision's system in Dublin, California; the channel was originally owned by Viacom. The first program to be broadcast on Showtime was Celebration, a concert special featuring performances by Rod Stewart, Pink Floyd and ABBA. By the end of its first year on the air, Showtime had a total of 55,000 subscribers nationwide. On March 7, 1978, Showtime became a nationally distributed service after it was uplinked to satellite, turning it into a competitor with HBO and other pay cable networks.

In 1979, Viacom sold a 50% ownership interest in Showtime to the TelePrompTer Corporation. On July 4, 1981, Showtime adopted a 24-hour programming schedule (rival HBO would eventually follow suit in December of that year). In 1982, Group W Cable, a subsidiary of Westinghouse Electric Corporation (which had acquired TelePrompTer the previous year), sold its 50% stake in Showtime back to Viacom for $75 million; the sale of Group W's stake in the channel occurred as the company had entered into a partnership with Walt Disney Productions (now The Walt Disney Company) to develop a competing premium service, The Disney Channel (Group W dropped out of the joint venture that September, due to disagreements over creative control and financial obligations). 1982 saw the premiere of Showtime's first made-for-cable movie Falcon's Gold and its first original series and children's program Faerie Tale Theatre.

Formation of Showtime Networks and ownership by Viacom (1982–2005) 
In August 1982, MCA Inc. (then-owner of Universal Pictures), Gulf+Western (then-owner of Paramount Pictures) and Warner Communications reached an agreement to jointly acquire The Movie Channel (TMC), in which the three companies combined would acquire a controlling 75% interest in the service (with each holding a 25% ownership stake) from Warner-Amex Satellite Entertainment. The proposal was motivated by the studios wanting to increase their share of revenue for licensing rights to their films to premium television services, as well as concerns that HBO's dominance of that market and its pre-buying of pay cable rights to films prior to their theatrical release would result in that service holding undue negotiating power for the television rights, resulting in a lower than suitable licensing fee rate the studios would be paid for individual films. The three companies officially announced their agreement in principle to acquire interests in TMC on November 11, 1982. Subsequently, in late December of that year, the U.S. Department of Justice (which had blocked a similar attempt by MCA, Gulf+Western, 20th Century Fox and Columbia Pictures to create a competing pay service, Premiere, in an antitrust case ruling two years earlier in January 1981) launched a routine preliminary inquiry into the proposed partnership.

On January 7, 1983, Viacom International added itself as a partner and drafted an amendment to the proposal to consolidate The Movie Channel with Showtime. Under the revised proposal, the four studios would each own a 22.58% stake in the two networks, with American Express owning a 9.68% minority interest. In addition, the consortium would appoint a management team separate from those employed by the two channels – which would continue to operate as separate services – to operate the joint venture. However, the deal ran into regulatory hurdles since Warner, Universal and Paramount received 50% of their respective total revenue from film releases and licensing fees from premium services; furthermore, Showtime and TMC combined would control about 30% of the pay cable marketplace, creating an oligopoly with HBO (which, in conjunction with Cinemax, controlled 60% of the market).

After a four-month investigation resulted in the Department of Justice filing a civil antitrust lawsuit against the five parties to block the Showtime-TMC merger on June 10, 1983, the Department asked Warner and American Express to restructure the deal during hearings for the case. The Department's decision – citing concerns, including some expressed by HBO management, that combining the assets of Showtime and TMC would stifle competition in the sale of their programming and that of other pay cable services to cable providers – was despite the fact that, under the original proposal, MCA, Gulf+Western and Warner had each agreed to continue licensing films released by their respective movie studios to competing pay television networks. The partners involved in the merger would also set standard prices for films that were acquired for broadcast on The Movie Channel and Showtime, either those produced by the studio partners or by unassociated film studios. To address the Justice Department's concerns over the deal, the four partners submitted another revised proposal for consideration on July 19, that included guarantees of conduct agreeing that Paramount, Universal and Warner Bros. would not receive higher residual licensing payments for films acquired by Showtime and The Movie Channel than that paid by other studios, and that all four partners would not permit the two channels in the venture to pay lower fees for films produced by three studio partners than that paid by smaller pay television services for the same films.

After the revised proposal was rejected on July 28, Warner Communications and American Express restructured the purchase to include only Viacom as a partner, bowing Gulf+Western and MCA out from the partnership. The changes – which Justice Department officials acknowledged would "prevent any anti-competitive effect from arising" following the merger, by allowing other premium services to enter the market should the venture significantly raise licensing fee prices for films – led the Justice Department to drop its challenge to the merger agreement on August 12; the department formally approved the deal the following day on August 13. When the deal was completed on September 6, 1983, the operations of The Movie Channel and Showtime were folded into a new holding company, Showtime/The Movie Channel, Inc., which was majority owned by Viacom (controlling 50% of the venture's common stock as well as investing $40 million in cash), with Warner Communications (which owned 31%) and Warner-Amex (which owned the remaining 19% interest) as minority partners.

As the consolidation of its operations with The Movie Channel was ongoing, in 1983, Showtime increased its national distribution on cable providers when competing premium service Spotlight ceased operations, effectively absorbing that channel's subscriber base.

1984 saw the network's first major promotional campaign, "We Make Excitement" (also referred to, particularly in bumpers and program introductions, as "Showtime Excitement"), created by the J. Walter Thompson company and utilizing an adapted version of the Pointer Sisters song "I'm So Excited". The campaign lasted into 1986 and coincided with both the exclusivity deal signed with Paramount for films (see below) and a graphical upgrade to the network's presentation to include computer-generated graphics.

On August 10, 1985, after Time Inc. and cable provider Tele-Communications Inc. (TCI) jointly submitted a bid to buy the company for $900 million and the assumption of $500 million in debt as well as an earlier offer by American Express the previous month to buy out Warner's share of the company (under a clause in the agreement that allowed either company the option of buying out their partner's stake in Warner-Amex), Warner Communications exercised an option to acquire American Express' 50% share of Warner-Amex Cable Communications for $450 million. Among the options, barring that it chose to sell Viacom a 50% interest in the company for $450 million, the deal originally excluded Warner-Amex's 19% interest in Showtime-The Movie Channel, Inc.; that interest would have reverted to Warner, which intended to operate Warner-Amex as a wholly owned subsidiary.

Two weeks later on August 26, Viacom acquired Warner Communications and Warner-Amex's combined 50% ownership interest in Showtime/The Movie Channel, Inc. as well as full ownership of the Warner-Amex and public shareholder interests in MTV Networks for $671.7 million, giving Viacom exclusive ownership of both networks and once again making it the sole owner of Showtime through its $500 million cash payment and acquisition of 1.625 million shares from Warner for the latter's 31% stake in Showtime/The Movie Channel and Warner-Amex's 19% interest in the unit and its 60% interest in MTV Networks (Viacom owned Showtime alone or jointly with other companies – TelePrompTer Corporation, and later briefly, its successor Group W Cable – from the time it launched in July 1976). The buyout, part of an option given by Warner in its purchase of American Express' interest in MTV, was exercised in part to finance much of the buyout of Showtime/The Movie Channel without borrowing any money (ironically, Warner Communications would eventually acquire rivals HBO and Cinemax, when the company merged with Time Inc. in 1989 to form Time Warner). The subsidiary was renamed Showtime Networks, Inc. in 1988.

Also in 1988, the company formed Showtime Event Television (now Showtime PPV) as a pay-per-view distributor of special event programming. In 1990, Showtime ventured into acquiring and premiering independent films exclusively for the channel as part of the 30-Minute Movie short film anthology series. One of its first premieres, 12:01 PM, was nominated for an Academy Award, while 1992's Session Man won an Academy Award for Best Live Action Short Film. In the years that followed, Showtime expanded its acquisitions into the realm of feature-length fare, including the Adrian Lyne-directed 1997 remake of Lolita.

On March 1, 1994, Showtime and The Movie Channel in conjunction with rivals HBO and Cinemax implemented a cooperative content advisory system to provide to parents specific information about pay-cable programming content that may be unsuitable for their children; the development of the system—inspired by the advisory ratings featured in program guides distributed by the major premium cable services—was in response to concerns from parents and advocacy groups about violent content on television, allowing Showtime Networks and other premium services discretionary authority to assign individual ratings corresponding to the objectionable content depicted in specific programs (and categorized based on violence, profanity, sexuality or miscellaneous mature material). A revised system—centered around ten content codes of two to three letters in length—was implemented by Showtime and the other participating premium services on June 10, 1994.

1997 saw the channel's first major rebrand since the 1980s, with a new logo emphasizing the "SHO" part of the network's name within a circle (intended to be a spotlight), playing into the channel's common acronym in listings services like TV Guide. A new slogan, "No Limits" (in reference to the fact that as a premium channel, Showtime could push the boundaries of programming without censorship, as well as offer the type of exciting programming that appealed to subscribers), and a bold red-and-black color scheme was instituted, with promotions and bumpers feature surrealistic imagery; the campaign was created by the newly formed in-house marketing and advertising agency, "Red Group".

In 2000, Showtime launched "Showtime Interactive 24.7", a service that provided DVD-style interaction of its entertainment offerings. The following year in 2001, Showtime became one of the first cable networks to launch a high definition simulcast feed (with Star Trek: Insurrection becoming the first film on the network to be broadcast in HD); Showtime also began to provide Dolby Digital 5.1 surround sound on select programs.

Under CBS Corporation ownership (2005–2019) 
On June 14, 2005, Viacom decided to separate itself into two companies (only six years after the company's acquisition of CBS), both of which would be controlled by Viacom parent National Amusements, amid stagnation of the company's stock price. When the split was completed on December 31, 2005, the original Viacom was restructured as CBS Corporation and acquired Showtime Networks along with CBS' broadcasting assets (including the CBS television network, UPN and the company's broadcast group, which became CBS Television Stations), Paramount Television (now the separate arms CBS Television Studios for network and cable production, and CBS Television Distribution for production of first-run syndicated programs and off-network series distribution), advertising firm Viacom Outdoor (renamed CBS Outdoor), Simon & Schuster, and Paramount Parks (which was later sold to Cedar Fair, L.P. on June 30, 2006). A new company that assumed the Viacom name kept Paramount Pictures, the MTV Networks and BET Networks cable divisions, and Famous Music (the latter of which was sold to Sony-ATV Music Publishing in May 2007).

Re-merger with Viacom (2019–present) 
On August 13, 2019, it was officially announced that CBS and Viacom would merge into a new entity known as ViacomCBS. Viacom CEO Bob Bakish will serve as president and CEO of the new company, while Ianniello will become chairman and CEO of CBS and oversee CBS-branded assets. Shari Redstone will also serve as chairperson of ViacomCBS. On October 29, 2019, National Amusements approved the re-merger deal. It closed on December 4, 2019. As part of the new structure, the Showtime Networks unit and its assets—Showtime, The Movie Channel and Flix—became part of the Premium Network Group division of ViacomCBS Domestic Media Networks, along with BET and temporarily Pop TV (which was transferred to the Youth & Entertainment Group division the following month, later named MTV Entertainment Group), to be overseen by SNI CEO David Nevins.

Channels

Background 
In 1991, after HBO and Cinemax debuted the first premium television multiplex service in the United States, Showtime followed with the testing of its own secondary service – Showtime 2 – on October 1 of that year. In April 1994, Showtime announced the creation of a new themed multiplex service, consisting of five channels: Spanish service Showtime En Espanol; family-oriented Showtime Family Television; action-oriented service Showtime Action Television; a service featuring comedy films and series called Showtime Comedy Television; and an all-movie channel called Showtime Film Festival. This planned extension to the multiplex did not come to fruition – although a third multiplex service, Showtime 3, would make its debut in 1996.

The multiplex would eventually expand over time with the launch of the action film channel Showtime Extreme on March 10, 1998, followed by the debut of the science fiction channel Showtime Beyond in September 1999; the Showtime Unlimited name for the Showtime multiplex, TMC and Flix came into use around this time. Three additional themed channels made their debut in March 2001: Showtime Family Zone (which carries films intended for family audiences), Showtime Next (a channel featuring films and series that appeal toward adults between the ages of 18 and 34 years old) and Showtime Women (a channel featuring movies, specials, 
and Showtime original programs that appeal toward a female audience). The programming format of Showtime 3 was overhauled five months later on July 1, 2001, to focus on theatrical movie releases and Showtime's original made-for-cable films, that under the new name Showcase.

Showtime Family Zone, Showtime Next and Showtime Women do not have distribution by most pay television providers as extensive as the other Showtime multiplex channels. The availability of either of the three channels on cable providers varies depending on the market; Dish Network only carries Showtime Family Zone, and DirecTV carries Showtime Next and Showtime Family Zone, but not Showtime Women.

List of Showtime channels 
Depending on the service provider, Showtime provides up to sixteen multiplex channels – eight 24-hour multiplex channels, all of which are simulcast in both standard definition and high definition  – as well as a video on demand service (Showtime On Demand). Showtime broadcasts its primary and multiplex channels on both Eastern and Pacific Time Zone schedules. The respective coastal feeds of each channel are usually packaged together (though most cable providers only offer the east and west coast feeds of the main Showtime channel), resulting in the difference in local airtimes for a particular movie or program between two geographic locations being three hours at most.

Subscribers to the separate premium film service The Movie Channel, which is also owned by ViacomCBS, do not necessarily have to subscribe to Showtime in order to receive TMC; both The Movie Channel and co-owned fellow movie service Flix are typically sold together in a package (although in the case of Flix, this depends on whether that channel is carried on a particular television provider), though DirecTV and Dish Network alternately sell TMC through a separate film tier. From 1999 to 2005, the package encompassing Showtime and its sister networks was marketed as “Showtime Unlimited”; the broader tier sometimes included the Sundance Channel (now SundanceTV) during this period, by way of the stake Showtime Networks held in the network from its 1996 inception until Sundance's 2008 purchase by Rainbow Media (now AMC Networks).

Other services

Showtime HD 
Showtime HD is a high definition simulcast feed of Showtime that broadcasts in the 1080i resolution format. In addition to its main channel, all of Showtime's multiplex channels also broadcast in the format, though availability of all of the HD feeds varies by provider. Showtime HD is available through virtually all providers which carry Showtime, along with Showtime's streaming services. Films shown on Showtime's HD simulcast feeds are broadcast in their native aspect ratio if that version is provided by the studios that maintain pay television distribution rights with the channel.

Showtime on Demand 
Showtime operates a subscription video-on-demand television service called Showtime on Demand, which is available at no additional charge to Showtime subscribers. Showtime on Demand offers feature films, episodes of Showtime's original series, adult programming and sports events. Showtime on Demand's rotating program selection incorporates select new titles that are added each Friday, alongside existing program titles held over from the previous one to two weeks. The service began to be test marketed in 2001 and was officially launched in July 2002.

Showtime Anytime 
On October 27, 2010, Showtime launched Showtime Anytime, a website that features around 400 hours of streaming program content available in standard or high definition that is accessible to subscribers of the Showtime television service. Content available on the service includes Showtime original programming, feature films, comedy specials, documentaries and sports programming. It is currently available nationally to Showtime subscribers of satellite provider AT&T DirecTV, and regionally by Comcast Xfinity; Spectrum; Optimum; Cox Communications; CenturyLink Prism; Grande Communications; Mediacom; AT&T U-verse; and Verizon FIOS. The Showtime Anytime app (which is offered as a free download) was initially released on the iOS App Store for the iPad and iPhone on October 3, 2011. On October 1, 2012, an Android app became available through the Google Play platform for Android devices.

In September 2017, it was discovered that the Showtime Anytime website was injected with code that mined the cryptocurrency Monero using the viewer's CPU, which would potentially cause degraded performance for other websites and applications. The code was removed as soon as it was discovered.

SHO Sync 
On September 22, 2011, Showtime launched Showtime Social, a second screen interactive app providing interactivity with Showtime programs including viewer-participant polls and trivia questions as well as real-time aggregation of Twitter, Facebook and blog comments about particular Showtime programs; the app utilizes Automated Content Recognition technology to generate interactive content regardless of whether it is being watched live, on-demand or by DVR; the app also displays heat maps depicting viewer reactions throughout the duration of an episode at the conclusion of the program. The app – which was renamed SHO Sync on September 13, 2012 – was originally released for Apple iOS devices (iPad and iPhone), with an app for LG-manufactured Smart TVs being released on August 15, 2013.

On July 9, 2015, Showtime announced it would discontinue SHO Sync, immediately discontinuing support of the iPad app with the iPhone and LG apps to be discontinued at a later date. However, the channel hinted that the core interactive functions of SHO Sync may be restored in a different form, with the possibility of being incorporated into Showtime Anytime and the Showtime over-the-top streaming service.

Streaming service 
On June 3, 2015, then-Showtime parent CBS Corporation announced that it would launch an over-the-top subscription video on demand service that would be distributed as a standalone offering without the requirement of having an existing television subscription to use (in the manner of competitor HBO's OTT offering, HBO Now). The service, which uses the same branding as the linear television channel, was officially launched on July 7, 2015 (coinciding with the season premieres of Ray Donovan and Masters of Sex on July 12). The service was initially available for purchase through Apple Inc. (to Apple TV and iOS devices), Hulu, Roku, PlayStation Vue and Amazon Prime as well as through Showtime's website (SHO.com).

The Showtime streaming service is identical to Showtime Anytime; it offers a back catalog of episodes of various past and present Showtime original series (with new episodes of Showtime original series being made available for streaming the same day as their original broadcast on the main linear Showtime channel), feature films and documentaries, and sports events and analysis programs.  Subscriptions are also available over Amazon Prime (Amazon Channels), Hulu, The Roku Channel, and Apple TV (Apple TV Channels) as add-ons.  Unlike HBO Now, Showtime also provides live streams of the East and West Coast television feeds of the linear Showtime channel (live streams of Showtime's multiplex services, and sister networks The Movie Channel, The Movie Channel Xtra, and Flix are not currently available on the service; live streams of Showtime's multiplex channels are available for Amazon Prime users as part of the Showtime add-on subscription).

Absorption into Paramount+ 
The service co-exists with Paramount Global's flagship streaming service Paramount+, and has since become part of a bundle offer with the service. In August 2022, the Paramount+ apps were updated with the ability to upgrade a subscription to the "Paramount+ with Showtime" bundle, and for subscribers to the bundle to access Showtime content from within the Paramount+ apps. Showtime would continue to be offered as a standalone service and application. However, in September, the company was in talks of moving the entire Showtime content within Paramount+. By December 2022, Paramount CEO Bob Bakish stated that it "didn't make sense to run Showtime as a 100% stand-alone organization".

On January 30, 2023, Paramount Global confirmed the two services would be fully merged in the near future in the United States, with both the Showtime linear service and the current Paramount+ Premium tier to be rebranded "Paramount+ with Showtime", echoing similar integrations in other international markets. The "Showtime" brand will remain active as a distinct programming imprint.

Programming 

Showtime's programming schedule currently consists largely of theatrically released feature films—which occupy much of the service's daily schedule, varying in quantity depending on channel—and original series targeted at adult audiences (including, dramas such as Shameless, Homeland, Yellowjackets, Billions, The Chi, The L Word: Generation Q and Penny Dreadful: City of Angels; comedies such as Black Monday, Our Cartoon President and Kidding; and docuseries such as The Circus and Vice). In addition, Showtime carries documentary films, boxing matches, sports-centric magazine series, occasional original stand-up comedy specials, and short-form behind-the-scenes specials centered mainly on theatrical films (either running in their initial theatrical or Showtime Networks broadcast window).

Since the early 1980s, Showtime has run an adult-oriented late night programming block on its main channel called "Showtime After Hours" (which was briefly branded as "Showtime Late Night" during the mid-1990s) each night after 12:00 a.m. Eastern Time; programs featured within the block include feature films, series produced specifically for broadcast during the block and occasional stand-up comedy specials. Softcore erotica programming has previously aired during the "After Hours" block, though adult films have been absent from Showtime's primary channel since the mid-2000s; the network began broadcasting a limited amount of original erotica series (such as Beach Heat: Miami) on its main channel in 2010, after having been absent for most of the previous decade. The network's multiplex channels Showtime 2 and Showtime Extreme also occasionally feature adult films during the overnight hours, though this has become less commonplace since late 2011.

Until the formation of Showtime Family Zone in 2001, Showtime heavily incorporated programming aimed at children and teenagers as part of its daytime schedule; in particular, the main channel ran a late afternoon block of teen-oriented series on Sundays (such as Ready or Not, Chris Cross and Degrassi High), as well as a morning block of shows aimed at younger children (such as OWL/TV and The Busy World of Richard Scarry) during the early and mid-1990s, and a weekday mid-afternoon and Sunday morning film block called "Showtime Familytime" that ran during the 1980s and 1990s.

The main Showtime network also carried, unusually for a premium channel, news programming; the now-defunct All News Channel (partially owned by Viacom) produced 90-second long news updates for Showtime in the early 1990s (ANC also produced news updates for fellow Viacom network VH1).

Original programming 
Showtime has become known in recent years for the network's original television programs, the most popular of which include the crime drama Dexter, the dark comedy drama Weeds, family dramas Ray Donovan and Shameless and the drama/thriller series Homeland. Other notable past and present original series include Stargate SG-1 (which ran on Showtime for its first five seasons, before moving to the Sci-Fi Channel (now Syfy) for the remainder of its run); Dead Like Me; Californication; Gigolos; Nurse Jackie; The Tudors; Brotherhood; Soul Food; Queer as Folk; The L Word; The Big C; Penn & Teller: Bullshit!; and United States of Tara. In mid-2017, the channel aired the critically acclaimed  third season of David Lynch's TV series Twin Peaks. From 2007 to 2013, multiplex service Showtime 2 broadcast an original program exclusive to that channel, the seasonal late night reality series Big Brother After Dark, a companion to sister broadcast network CBS' American adaptation of Big Brother; the program moved to TVGN (which has since been renamed Pop) starting with the June 26, 2013 premiere of Big Brothers 15th season.

Showtime formerly produced its own original made-for-cable movies, originally branded as "Showtime Original Movies" until 1994 and "Showtime Original Pictures" thereafter until the channel discontinued producing television films in 2007. Showtime is also one of only two premium cable services (alongside Disney Channel during its existence as a premium channel prior to 1997) that has produced original movies aimed at family audiences; these films were originally broadcast under the separate banner "Showtime Original Pictures for Kids" from 1995 to 1997 and "Showtime Original Pictures for All Ages" from 1997 to 2005.

Showtime After Hours 
A signature feature of Showtime was a late-night block known as Showtime After Hours, which featured softcore pornographic films and original series. Showtime did not have set start or end times for the block, as they varied depending on the mainstream feature films – and original series on certain nights – that aired prior to and following it, and also depended on the number of programs and programs in particular that were scheduled to air within the block. Programs that aired under the Showtime After Hours banner carried either a TV-MA or R rating (usually the former), primarily for strong sexual content and nudity. The block had often been the subject of both scrutiny in the media and a source of humor in popular culture, with references to Showtime's late night programming being featured in various films and television shows.

Movie library 
, Showtime – and sister channels The Movie Channel and Flix – maintains exclusive first-run film licensing agreements with Amblin Partners (including releases produced in conjunction with DreamWorks Pictures, which maintains a pay television licensing agreement for its other releases with Showtime rivals HBO and Cinemax, and Participant), IFC Films, A24, and Bleecker Street.

Despite being corporately reunited with Paramount Pictures in 2019 as a result of the ViacomCBS merger, that film studio maintains an existing output deal with MGM+ (formerly Epix, which Paramount co-owned with Lionsgate and MGM from its 2009 launch until 2018); this, along with the launch of Paramount+ (which will in some cases stream the studio's new releases as few as 45 days after their theatrical releases), makes it highly unlikely that new Paramount releases will stream and broadcast on Showtime for the foreseeable future.

Showtime also shows sub-runs – runs of films that have already received broadcast or syndicated television airings – of theatrical films distributed by Sony Pictures (including content from Columbia Pictures, TriStar Pictures, Screen Gems, Revolution Studios and Morgan Creek Productions), Warner Bros. Pictures (including content from New Line Cinema), Universal Pictures (including content from subsidiary Focus Features), Open Road Films, Screen Media, Oscilloscope (select films), Summit Entertainment (for films released prior to 2013), Paramount Pictures (for films released prior to 2017), Metro-Goldwyn-Mayer (including content from subsidiary United Artists), Lionsgate (sub-run rights with the latter two studios are for films released prior to 2009), and Walt Disney Pictures (including content from Pixar, Walt Disney Animation Studios, Walt Disney Studios Motion Pictures and Marvel Studios).

The window between a film's initial release in theaters and its initial screening on Showtime and sister channels The Movie Channel and Flix is wider than the grace period leading to a film's initial broadcast on HBO/Cinemax, Starz/Encore, and Epix. Films that Showtime has pay cable rights to will usually also run on The Movie Channel and Flix during the period of its term of licensing.

Former first-run contracts 
Within years of its launch, Showtime entered into licensing agreements with several movie studios. Following Viacom's 1983 acquisition of a joint stake in The Movie Channel, Paramount Pictures (then-owned by Gulf+Western) signed a five-year exclusive first-run distribution agreement with Showtime and The Movie Channel to carry the studio's films through 1989. On July 15, 1987, HBO signed a five-year deal with Paramount Pictures to broadcast 85 of their films released from May 1988 onward; in May 1989, after it signed a licensing deal with HBO, Paramount filed a lawsuit against Showtime Networks, Viacom and its parent National Amusements over Showtime's alleged refusal to pay a total of $88 million in fees for five films (that underperformed in their theatrical release) to reduce the minimum liability for its 75-film package from the studio. After Paramount Pictures was purchased by Viacom in 1994, Showtime (which was also owned by Viacom at the time) signed a seven-year distribution deal with that studio which took effect in January 1998, following the expiration of Paramount's contract with HBO.

In 1986, Showtime signed an agreement with Buena Vista Motion Pictures Group; its contract with Walt Disney Pictures expired after 1992, while output deals with Touchstone and Hollywood expired after 1996. Rival pay channel Starz signed a deal with Disney in 1994, carrying only Touchstone and Hollywood films released from January 1997 onward early on. By 1989, the channel had already made exclusive deals with Carolco Pictures (signed in 1988), Atlantic Entertainment Group, Cannon Films (both signed in 1986), Universal Pictures, De Laurentiis Entertainment Group, Imagine Entertainment (signed in 1986), and Weintraub Films.

On April 13, 1990, Showtime signed an exclusive first-run film output deal with New Line Cinema; the deal expired after 1995. In July 1993, Encore signed an output deal with New Line Cinema, broadcasting its films released between 1994 and 2004. On November 22, 1993, Showtime signed exclusive first-run premium cable rights with Metro-Goldwyn-Mayer (renewing an existing pact with the studio) and United Artists, which were renewed for nine additional years in 2000. On March 5, 1996, Showtime announced a seven-year output deal with Phoenix Pictures (as part of an agreement that also included the purchase of an 11% equity interest), broadcasting titles from that studio released between 1996 and 2002. During that time, Showtime also maintained output deals with TriStar Pictures (between 1994 and 1999), Castle Rock Entertainment (which expired after 1999), PolyGram Filmed Entertainment (which expired after 2001), and Artisan Entertainment. In 2006, Showtime entered into a partial deal with Rogue Pictures to broadcast select films released by the studio (especially those originally produced for home video release).

On December 4, 2008, Showtime signed a four-year exclusive first-run distribution deal with Summit Entertainment, broadcasting 42 films that were released by that studio between 2009 and 2012. On May 27, 2011, rival premium channel HBO had signed an output deal with Summit, allowing films that were released between 2013 and 2017 to be broadcast on the channel. Showtime formerly had a deal with The Weinstein Company (since 2009, including releases by Dimension Films). Netflix assumed the rights to The Weinstein Company's films starting in 2016.

Paramount Pictures, Lionsgate, and MGM 
The future of Showtime was put into question after negotiations to renew film output deals with Paramount Pictures (which was separated from the channel following the November 2005 split of Viacom and CBS into two separate companies, with CBS Corporation taking ownership of Showtime; the companies would however re-merge 14 years later), MGM, and Lions Gate Entertainment broke down, due to the failure between the studios and Showtime to agree on licensing fees for movies from the channel's three largest film distributors. All three studios then entered into a joint venture, Studio 3 Partners, to form Epix as a competitor to Showtime, HBO and Starz; Epix debuted in May 2009 as a broadband Internet service, with the television channel launching on October 30 of that year.

The loss of newer films from Paramount, MGM, and Lions Gate Entertainment left Showtime without rights to any major studio's films for the first time in the channel's history, leaving "mini-majors" DreamWorks and The Weinstein Company as its principal film distributors, along with agreements with several independent studios.

A24 
Since November 13, 2019, Showtime is the exclusive premium cable broadcaster for films distributed by A24 (excluding titles part of the latter's already-existing partnership with Apple Inc.) through an output deal made between the two entities.

Sports programming 
Showtime broadcasts a limited amount of sports programming, which is produced by the channel's Showtime Sports division. Showtime also operates Showtime PPV (formerly Showtime Entertainment Television or SET), which broadcasts boxing matches and other select event programming for pay-per-view. Beginning in March 1986, Showtime's sports programming consisted largely of boxing matches produced under the banner Showtime Championship Boxing; in 2001, the network launched ShoBox: The New Generation, focusing primarily on up-and-coming boxers. In 2004, Showtime began broadcasting all domestic fights telecast on the channel in high definition.

In December 2006, Showtime announced a deal to broadcast mixed martial arts matches from the then-newly formed Elite Xtreme Combat (or EliteXC), an MMA organization formed by Showtime Networks and ProElite, Inc., with all events broadcast under the banner ShoXC; the league folded two years later in 2008.

In 2008, Showtime acquired Inside the NFL, the longest-running program in the history of HBO, from that network after it had cancelled the seasonal analysis and interview program in February of that year; Inside the NFL moved to Showtime that September. In 2021, Inside the NFL moved to Paramount+.

In February 2009, mixed martial arts promotion Strikeforce announced a three-year broadcast agreement with Showtime, allowing it to broadcast up to 16 events per year, as well as a deal with sister network CBS for an option to produce up to four events for that network; Strikeforce ended its run on Showtime when the league folded in January 2013. In addition to broadcasting big-ticket Strikeforce events on Showtime, the promotion also announced it would produce ShoMMA: Strikeforce Challengers, an event series highlighting up-and-coming fighters.

In 2010, Showtime debuted another original sports insider program, Inside NASCAR, focusing on interviews and analysis from around the NASCAR circuit. In 2011, Showtime expanded its MMA programming by televising events produced by M-1 Global, the Russian PTC company of popular Strikeforce fighter Fedor Emelianenko. In November 2012, Showtime debuted a sports-themed spinoff of CBS' long-running newsmagazine 60 Minutes, titled 60 Minutes Sports.

From 2012 to 2015, Showtime also aired an hour-long program called Jim Rome on Showtime, featuring the CBS Sports Radio host's commentary and interviews with personalities in the sports world.

On February 9, 2021, it was announced that Showtime would be the exclusive home of Bellator MMA beginning with Bellator 255 on April 2 (the ViacomCBS merger made Bellator and Showtime corporate siblings). This will be the first time mixed martial arts has aired on Showtime since Strikeforce was absorbed by the UFC.

International 
Outside of the United States, several pay television networks have utilized the Showtime name and former logo through licensing agreements with Showtime Networks for some period of time, such as Showtime Australia, Showtime Arabia, Showtime Scandinavia and Spain's Showtime Extreme. Showtime launched a South African version as part of the new TopTV satellite provider's package on May 1, 2010. 

In January 2015, CBS announced an exclusive Canadian brand and content licensing agreement with domestic broadcaster Bell Media, under which Showtime programming would air exclusively on Bell's services including The Movie Network and CraveTV (later consolidated under the Crave name); prior to this, The Movie Network and now-defunct counterpart Movie Central had been licensing Canadian rights to current Showtime programming. Later that year, Chinese streamer PPTV agreed to a multiyear license to stream CBS and Showtime series in the country, giving 400 million users access to select Showtime series from CBS.

Showtime programming is also distributed in selected countries/territories through localized versions of Paramount+, including Australia, Latin America, the United Kingdom and Ireland.

SkyShowtime 

SkyShowtime is a joint-venture between Paramount Global's Showtime and Comcast's Sky Group that combines programming from the corporations' Paramount+ and Peacock services. SkyShowtime launched in European markets where Sky does not operate their satellite and cable services, with viewers in countries like the United Kingdom and Ireland getting access to both Paramount+ and Peacock on their Sky Q and NOW boxes along with Sky Glass television sets instead.

The streaming platform was launched in the Nordic countries on September 20, 2022, where it replaced the previously operated Paramount+. It later arrived in the Netherlands and Portugal on October 25, 2022. On December 14, 2022, SkyShowtime launched in Bosnia and Herzegovina, Bulgaria, Slovenia, Serbia, Croatia, Montenegro and Kosovo. SkyShowtime launched on February 14, 2023 in the rest of Central and Eastern Europe, and finished its expansion by releasing in Spain and Andorra on February 28, 2023.

SkyShowtime unveiled on January 10, 2023 the acquisition of the streaming rights to various HBO Max originals produced in Europe for their streaming platform, including series that were originally intended to be released on HBO Max prior to the Warner Bros. Discovery merger.

Notes

References

External links

 
 Showtime Streaming
 Showtime Anytime (streaming content accessible only to subscribers of participating television providers)

 
1976 establishments in New York City
Cable television in the United States
Commercial-free television networks in the United States
English-language television stations in the United States
Movie channels
Peabody Award winners
Showtime Networks
Television channels and stations established in 1976
Television networks in the United States
Westinghouse Broadcasting